is a professional Go player.

Biography
Kaori Chinen became a professional in 1993. She was promoted to 3 dan four years later in 1997. She married fellow professional go player Yo Kagen in 1997. She holds the female record for longest defense of a title, keeping the Women's Kisei for 6 straight years.

Titles & runners-up

Notes

External links
Nihon Ki-in profile (in Japanese)
GoBase Biography

1974 births
Japanese Go players
Female Go players
Living people